Newspapers published in Nigeria have a strong tradition of the principle of "publish and be damned" that dates back to the colonial era when founding fathers of the Nigerian press such as Nnamdi Azikiwe, Ernest Ikoli, Obafemi Awolowo and Lateef Jakande used their papers to fight for independence.

Until the 1990s, most publications were government-owned, but private papers such as the Daily Trust, Nigerian Tribune, The Punch, Vanguard and the Guardian continued to expose public and private scandals despite government attempts at suppression.

Laws related to the media, including newspapers, are scattered across various pieces of legislation. There are few good sources of discussion and analysis of these laws.

Some Newspapers depend heavily on advertisements that may be placed by companies owned by powerful people. In some cases, this makes the papers cautious in reporting details of crimes or suspected crimes, and sometimes they carry articles that paint clearly corrupt individuals in a favourable light. An analysis of newspapers shows a strong bias towards coverage of males, reflecting prevalent cultural biases. Few articles discuss women and there are few photographs of women outside the fashion sections.
Although earnings have declined since the late 1980s the number of publications has steadily grown.

As of 2008 there were over 100 national, regional or local newspapers.

Online newspapers have become popular since the rise of internet accessibility in Nigeria; more than ten percent of the top fifty websites in the country are devoted to online newspapers. Due to improved mobile penetration and the growth of smartphones, Nigerians have begun to rely on the internet for news. Online newspapers have also been able to bypass government restrictions because content can be shared without the need for any physical infrastructure. The result has been a disruption of the traditional sources of news which have dominated the media industry. Recent online newspapers include Sahara Reporters, Ripples Nigeria, and Premium Times.

List of newspapers 

This is a list of newspapers in Nigeria. The list includes print and online newspapers currently published in Nigeria that have national circulation or that are major local newspapers.

See also
 Brown envelope journalism, Nigeria
 Media of Nigeria
 List of radio stations in Nigeria
 List of television stations in Nigeria
 Telecommunications in Nigeria

References

Sources

 
 
 
 
  
 
  (Includes articles about Nigerian newspapers)

External links
 
 
 
 
 

 
Lists of newspapers by country